Churchtown is a village in County Cork, Republic of Ireland. The Irish name is Brugh/Brú Thuinne meaning Great House of the Pastureland. Churchtown is within the Cork North-West Dáil constituency.

Etymology 
According to the Journal of the Ivernian Society, Churchtown is a translation of Baile an Teampuill, the former ecclesiastical name of the parish which had replaced the non- ecclesiastical Brú Thuinne – the ‘Royal House of the Pasture Lands’. The name of the parish, Brú Thuinne, has been the subject of much debate. Some scholars suggest that it is Brúgh, ‘a habitation’. Patrick Weston Joyce defines Brúgh as ‘a mansion’. Reverend Canon J.F. Lynch states: ‘Bruhenny is a diminutive form of Bruach, border or edge, and it is named Brochoyn and Bruchhane in the Pipe Roll of Cloyne.’ Others have identified the parish as ‘the marshy part of Orrery in County Cork’, leading to speculation that part of the name may have been derived from the genitive of the common word Tonn, meaning 'low-lying or pasture land'.

History 

The area that now comprises the parish of Churchtown was settled at least 4,000 years ago. A Bronze Age axe head discovered in the parish is evidence of such settlement.  Much of the village, which consisted primarily of thatched houses, was burned by the Whiteboys in January 1822 during an attack on the police barracks. Lord Egmont’s agent, Sir Edward Tierney, commenced the rebuilding of Churchtown in 1825 and the work continued until its completion in 1849. The village was built in the form of a square, one side of which was named Egmont Row. The main street was George’s Street and that running west was named Kerry Lane. The double row of houses on the Buttevant Road was called Chapel Lane, while the road to the east leading to the main Cork–Limerick road was named Lodge Road (now Burton Road).

Education 
The first school in Churchtown was built from an endowment by Sir John Perceval in 1702. The dissolution of the school in 1720 was largely brought about by the reluctance of parents to ‘bind’ the children to the Master of the school rather than to tradesmen. A later grammar school at Burton was also a failure. The original Churchtown National School on Kerry Lane was built by Sir Edward Tierney and completed in 1847. Later the school was moved to another building and this building was turned into a community center. It is the only school in the parish. As of 2005, the school had an attendance of forty girls and boys.

Ecology 
A wide variety of flora and fauna grow in the parish. Ballygrace and Stack’s Bridge are considered areas of particular ecological value. Recorded varieties of trees common to the parish include: apple, crab apple, ash, alder, beech, cedar, chestnut, cypress, elm, fir, hazel, holly, larch, lime, monkey puzzle, oak, pear, pine, spruce, sycamore, willow and yew. Fauna includes the badger, fox, hare, shrew, red squirrel, stoat and bat. Birds include the goldcrest, sparrow hawk, kestrel and barn owl, as well as all other common songbirds.

Events 
The Churchtown Carnival was a week-long annual fund-raising festival begun in the late 1940s under the guidance of Muintir na Tíre. The carnival was an important part of the town's culture and was still being held till the 1970s. The event was advertised in surrounding parishes and held at the community center.

Notable people
Seán "Clárach" Mac Domhnaill - poet 
Gerry Murphy - entrepreneur and author of the Accidental Entrepreneur.
John Murphy (fiddle player) - fiddle Player 
Vincent O'Brien - horse trainer
Oliver Reed - The English actor lived in the village during the last years of his life.  He is buried in Bruhenny Graveyard, located just off the village square, opposite his favourite pub, O'Brien's Bar.
Barry O'Meara - Napoleon's Doctor on Saint Helena stayed in the village circa 1815-1822

The names of Barry O'Meara, Seán "Clárach" Mac Domhnaill and Vincent O'Brien are listed on a "Jockey on Horse" statue in the village centre.

See also
 List of towns and villages in Ireland
 Market Houses in Ireland

References

External links
 Churchtown Website

Towns and villages in County Cork
Articles on towns and villages in Ireland possibly missing Irish place names